"(Reach Up for The) Sunrise" is a song recorded by English pop rock band Duran Duran. It was released as the lead single from their eleventh studio album, Astronaut (2004) and their 31st single overall. It was the first single since "A View to a Kill" in 1985 to feature all five of the original members of the band. The song was sent to US radio on 30 August 2004 and was issued physically over the following few months.

Upon its release, "Sunrise" debuted and peaked at number five on the UK Singles Chart, giving the band their 14th top-10 hit in their native country. It was highly successful in Italy, where it reached number two, as well as in Denmark and Spain, peaking at number six in both countries. In the United States, the single topped the Billboard Dance Club Songs chart, Duran Duran's third and last song to do so.

Chart performance
"Sunrise" peaked at number five on the UK Singles Chart in October 2004 and reached number one on the US Billboard Hot Dance Music/Club Play chart on 4 December 2004. The Jason Nevins newly produced version is the main version of the song. It marked the band's first top ten in the UK since "Ordinary World" and their highest charting single since "A View to a Kill, even though its chart stay was only four weeks. Elsewhere, the song reached number six in Denmark and Spain and number two in Italy, where it became the soundtrack of a telephone advertising campaign.

Music video
The video was directed by Michael and Mark Polish (aka the Polish Brothers), and featured each band member on their own journey across various landscapes, only to be joined together on a stage before an intense sunrise for the chorus.

Each band member's storyline was filmed in a different film or digital format, creating a very different look for each set of scenes.  Several versions of the video were made available on the Internet, with each version focusing on the storyline of one band member.

The band plays the Jason Nevins version live in concert. Jason has co-production credit, to which he is credited in the liner notes on the album.

Track listings

UK CD1 and European CD single
 "(Reach Up for The) Sunrise" (album version) – 3:24
 "(Reach Up for The) Sunrise" (Alex G Cosmic mix) – 5:44

UK CD2
 "(Reach Up for The) Sunrise" (album version) – 3:24
 "(Reach Up for The) Sunrise" (Jason Nevins radio mix) – 4:15
 "(Reach Up for The) Sunrise" (Ferry Corsten dub mix) – 7:25
 "Know It All" – 2:30
 "(Reach Up for The) Sunrise" (video) – 3:24

German mini-CD single
 "(Reach Up for The) Sunrise" – 3:24
 "(Reach Up for The) Sunrise" (Peter Presta NY tribal mix) – 5:55

US CD single
 "(Reach Up for The) Sunrise"
 "Know It All"

Australian CD single
 "(Reach Up for The) Sunrise"
 "(Reach Up for The) Sunrise" ([Alex G Cosmic mix)
 "(Reach Up for The) Sunrise" (Ferry Corsten dub mix)
 "(Reach Up for The) Sunrise" (Peter Presta NY tribal mix)
 "Know It All"

Personnel
Duran Duran
 Simon Le Bon – vocals
 Nick Rhodes – keyboards
 John Taylor – bass
 Andy Taylor – guitar, backing vocals
 Roger Taylor – drums

Additional musicians
 Sally Boyden – backing vocals

Production
 Don Gilmore – producer, engineer
 Duran Duran – producer
 Nile Rodgers – vocal producer
 Jason Nevins – additional producer, programming, engineer, mixer
 Jeremy Wheatley – mixing
 Daniel Mendez – engineer
 Francesco Cameli – assistant engineer
 Leon Zervos – mastering

Notes
 signifies an additional producer

Charts

Weekly charts

Year-end charts

Release history

Covers, samples, & media references
At the end of an episode of Las Vegas, the band appeared, performing the song in the Montecito as was normal during the Second Season.

, the Jason Nevins newly produced version of the song is used in the beginning sequence of the television programme Sunrise on Seven Network in Australia.  It was also used in Telecom Italia Mobile commercials with Adriana Lima. The Jason Nevins version appeared on an episode of Queer Eye for the Straight Guy as well as the television soundtrack, released on Capitol Records.

Also, the Jason Nevins Club Mix is featured in the 2007 arcade game Dance Dance Revolution SuperNOVA 2.

See also
 List of Billboard Hot Dance Club Play number ones of 2004

References

External links
 Official site
 Duran Duran Timeline: 2004
 Duran Duran Collection: Sunrise

2004 singles
Duran Duran songs
2004 songs
Epic Records singles
Songs written by Simon Le Bon
Songs written by John Taylor (bass guitarist)
Songs written by Roger Taylor (Duran Duran drummer)
Songs written by Andy Taylor (guitarist)
Songs written by Nick Rhodes